Abbrescia is an Italian surname. Notable people with the surname include:

Dino Abbrescia (born 1966), Italian actor
Joe Abbrescia (1936–2005), American painter
Simeone Di Cagno Abbrescia (born 1944), Italian politician

Italian-language surnames